Roger Kennerson is a British figure skater who competed in ice dance.

With partner Yvonne Suddick, he won two bronze medals (in 1964 and 1965) and one silver medal (in 1966) at the European Figure Skating Championships.

Competitive highlights 
With  Yvonne Suddick

References 

British male ice dancers